Le Trabendo is a musical concert venue located at the Parc de la Villette, in the 19th arrondissement of Paris, France. It has a capacity of 700. In 2000,

References

External links
Official Homepage

Music venues in Paris
Buildings and structures in the 19th arrondissement of Paris
Music venues in France